Ed is a 1996 American sports comedy film about a talented baseball pitcher and his friendly ball-playing chimpanzee as his team's mascot.

The film received negative reviews from critics, with a 0% on Rotten Tomatoes.

Plot

In Santa Rosa, California, Jack "Deuce" Cooper (Matt LeBlanc) is a farm boy who arrives at an open tryout for the Santa Rosa Rockets minor league baseball team. He makes the team after blowing away the scouts with his 'rocket' arm as well as having a strong training camp. Deuce also befriends a chimpanzee, 'Ed,' after being told the chimp is his new roommate/teammate. After they move into their apartment, Deuce develops a relationship with his neighbor, Lydia. Also, Ed becomes very close with her daughter, Elizabeth. Deuce's game really begins to take off as well as Ed's and the team becomes a league contender. Deuce's coach, Chubb, thinks Deuce can be an MLB starter if he keeps his head on straight. But after the owners sell Ed to make a buck, Deuce takes matters into his own hands and goes to find Ed only to see him being tortured by a pair of goons. Deuce saves Ed but Ed escapes and finds a truck of frosted bananas and does not realize he is stuck inside the trailer, which is ice cold. Ed ends up in the hospital from almost freezing to death before the final game of the season and Deuce questions his own ability to continue playing without his best friend. Deuce ends up playing and struggles right off the bat. But when Ed, Elizabeth and Lydia arrive at the game together, Deuce turns up the heat and the Rockets take the championship. Deuce eventually gets called up to the Dodgers. In the end, Ed, Deuce, Lydia and Elizabeth then become a family and live happily ever after.

Cast
 Matt LeBlanc as Jack "Deuce" Cooper
 Jay Caputo and Denise Cheshire as Ed
 Jayne Brook as Lydia
 Doren Fein as Liz
 Jack Warden as Chubb
 Bill Cobbs as Tipton
 Jim Caviezel as Dizzy
 Jim O'Heir as Art
 Steve Eastin as Shark's Manager 
 Brad Hunt as Carnie
 Sage Allen as Cooper's Mother
 Stan Ivar	as Cooper's Father

Reception
The film was a box office disappointment.

It received four Razzie Award nominations for Worst Picture, Worst Screenplay (David M. Evans), and Worst Screen Couple (for LeBlanc and Ed the chimpanzee), losing all of those categories to Striptease starring Demi Moore. LeBlanc was also nominated for Worst New Star for his role, but "lost" to Pamela Anderson in Barb Wire. 
Audiences surveyed by CinemaScore gave the film a grade of "B+" on a scale of A+ to F.

References

External links

 

1996 films
1990s buddy comedy films
1990s sports comedy films
American baseball films
American buddy comedy films
American sports comedy films
Films about animals playing sports
Films about apes
Films directed by Bill Couturié
Films with screenplays by David Mickey Evans
Universal Pictures films
1996 comedy films
1990s American films